Jerry V. Millsapps (born November 12, 1933) is a former American football coach.  He was the 16th head football coach for the Howard Payne University in Brownwood, Texas serving for two seasons, from 1986 to 1987, and compiling a record of 5–15.

Millsapps graduated from Lamesa High School in Lamesa, Texas in 1952.  He then played college football for four years as a quarterback at Howard Payne before graduating in 1956.

Head coaching record

College

References

1933 births
Living people
American football quarterbacks
Howard Payne Yellow Jackets football coaches
Howard Payne Yellow Jackets football players
High school football coaches in Texas
People from Lamesa, Texas
Players of American football from Texas